Lethe gemina,  Tytler's treebrown, is a species of Satyrinae butterfly found in the  Indomalayan realm (West China, Naga Hills and, as subspecies zaitha Fruhstorfer, 1914, Taiwan)

References

gemina
Butterflies of Asia